The 2021–22 Cornell Big Red men's basketball team represented Cornell University in the 2021–22 NCAA Division I men's basketball season. The Big Red, led by fifth-year head coach Brian Earl, played their home games at Newman Arena in Ithaca, New York as members of the Ivy League.

Previous season
Due to the COVID-19 pandemic, the Ivy League chose not to conduct a season in 2020–21.

Roster

Schedule and results

|-
!colspan=12 style=|Non-conference regular season

|-
!colspan=12 style=|Ivy League regular season

|-
!colspan=12 style=| Ivy League tournament

|-

Sources

References

Cornell Big Red men's basketball seasons
Cornell Big Red
Cornell Big Red men's basketball